Doğuhan Aral Şimşir (born 19 June 2002) is a Danish professional footballer who plays as a forward for FC Midtjylland.

Club career

Midtjylland
Şimşir was born to Turkish parents in Denmark. His family hails from the Sivas Province in the Central Anatolia Region, which is why he wears the number 58 as his shirt number, which is also region's registration number. Şimşir initially played in the youth teams of HB Køge before moving to Midtjylland at U15-level. 

On 1 June 2020, aged 17, he made his Danish Superliga debut when he came on as a 64th-minute substitute for Anders Dreyer in the 1–0 loss to AC Horsens. Midtjylland qualified for the championship round, in which Şimşir made two more appearances for the first team, in which the club finished as champions. 

On 22 September 2021, Şimşir scored his first professional goal in a 5–0 win over Kjellerup IF in the Danish Cup.

Loan to Jerv
On 7 March 2022, Şimşir joined Norwegian club Jerv on loan for the 2022 season. He scored his first goal for the club on 18 April, becoming the matchwinner in a 1–0 victory against Kristiansund in Eliteserien.

Personal life
Born in Denmark, Şimşir is of Turkish descent.

Career statistics

Club

References

External links
Profile at the FC Midtjylland website

2002 births
Living people
Citizens of Turkey through descent
People from Køge
Danish men's footballers
Denmark youth international footballers
Danish people of Turkish descent
Association football forwards
Danish Superliga players
Eliteserien players
HB Køge players
FC Midtjylland players
FK Jerv players
Danish expatriate men's footballers
Expatriate footballers in Norway
Danish expatriate sportspeople in Norway
Sportspeople from Region Zealand